Frank Goedeke is a retired South African-born German rugby player. He gained selection as a utility player in the German Sevens team and as a centre for the German national team in the late 1990s.

Early life

Goedeke received his schooling in South Africa, where he played wing for Maritzburg College and the University of Natal, as well as representative teams such as the South African Schools' XV and the Natal Duikers.

Playing career

In Germany, Goedeke was a member of the TSV Victoria Linden squad which reached the final of the 2000 German Championship and won the national Sevens Championship later that year.

Goedeke represented  the German Sevens team in the Punta Del Este and Mar del Plata legs of the 1999–00 World Sevens Series. He also played for the German national XV in the German Rugby Federation Centenary Match against the Barbarians in 2000 and in the European Nations Cup in 2001.

Club Honours

 German Rugby Sevens championship - TSV Victoria Linden 2000

References 

Living people
German rugby union players
Germany international rugby union players
TSV Victoria Linden players
SC Neuenheim players
Rugby union centres
South African people of German descent
Alumni of Maritzburg College
Year of birth missing (living people)
South African rugby union players